Wiebe Johan Wolters (25 December 1932 – 15 January 2011) was a Singaporean sportsman who represented his country in swimming and water polo.

Biography
Born in the Dutch East Indies, Wolters moved to Singapore as a child, Wolters started out as a competitive swimmer, specialising in sprint events. He won a silver medal in the 100 m freestyle at the 1951 Asian Games in New Delhi and was a member of the 4 x 100 m freestyle gold medal winning relay team.

Unable to make the Olympics as a swimmer, he changed his focus to water polo and won another Asian Games gold medal in 1954 with the Singapore men's national water polo team. He represented Singapore in water polo at the 1956 Summer Olympics in Melbourne, where the team finished 10th. His elder brother Alexander was one of his teammates.

References

External links
 
 
 

1932 births
2011 deaths
Singaporean male freestyle swimmers
Singaporean male water polo players
Olympic water polo players of Singapore
Water polo players at the 1956 Summer Olympics
Asian Games medalists in swimming
Asian Games medalists in water polo
Asian Games gold medalists for Singapore
Asian Games silver medalists for Singapore
Swimmers at the 1951 Asian Games
Water polo players at the 1951 Asian Games
Water polo players at the 1954 Asian Games
Medalists at the 1951 Asian Games
Medalists at the 1954 Asian Games
Singaporean people of Dutch descent
20th-century Singaporean people